Faysal Abd al-Latif al-Shaabi (1935–2 April 1970) was the Prime Minister of the People's Republic of South Yemen from 6 April 1969 until the political coup (Corrective Move) that led to Salim Ali Rubai's ascendance to power on 22 June 1969. Al-Shaabi was appointed Prime Minister by President Qahtan Mohammed al-Shaabi. After being ousted, al-Shaabi was kept under house arrest, but was moved to a detention camp at the end of March 1970.  On 3 April 1970, the government radio in Aden broadcast a report that al-Shaabi "was fatally wounded when he tried to escape the detention camp."

References

1935 births
1971 deaths
1971 murders in Asia
Prime Ministers of South Yemen
Nasserists
Yemeni Arab nationalists
Yemeni socialists
People from Lahij Governorate
South Yemen independence activists
Leaders ousted by a coup